The freguesias (civil parishes) of Portugal are listed in by municipality according to the following format:
 concelho
 freguesias

Horta (Azores)
 Angústias (Horta)
 Capelo
 Castelo Branco
 Cedros
 Conceição
 Feteira
 Flamengos
 Matriz (Horta)
 Pedro Miguel
 Praia do Almoxarife
 Praia do Norte
 Ribeirinha
 Salão

H